Nikolay Semenovich Anisimov (December 30, 1877, Orenburg Governorate – April 8, 1931, Moscow) was a major general of the White Army, a journalist, a representative of the Union of Cossack troops, and a candidate to the Russian Constituent Assembly; he was accused of espionage and executed after his return to the USSR.

Emigration and Return to the USSR

After the death of Kolchak, he continued to serve in the armed forces of the Russian Eastern Outskirts under the leadership of Ataman Semenov, where he became an authorized representative of OKW. He was evacuated to Korea (port of Henzan) on the ship "Eldorado". He found himself in exile in Harbin.

In the fall of 1920, he received from Ataman Semenov 100 thousand rubles in gold to support the Orenburg Cossacks who found themselves in China. In 1921, after the death of the chieftain Dutov, it was N. Anisimov who was elected deputy army chieftain OKV. Arrived in Grodekovo; He was enrolled in food allowance in Vladivostok. During this period, he received at the disposal of about 50 thousand rubles of military equipment. February 16, 1923 he was removed from his post for embezzlement of the military box office.

On March 20, 1925, the Soviet Consulate General appeared with the ambassador, presenting the ambassador a petition signed by 74 Cossacks. The signatories declared their desire to return to their homeland. On March 29, Consul General of the USSR E.K. Ozarnin, accompanied by Vice Consul Wilde, representative of Vneshtorg Ponomorenko and representatives of the Voluntary Fleet, arrived in Shanghai aboard the Mongugai steamer to raise the Soviet flag. April 5, 1925 N. Anisimov and 240 Cossacks departed from Shanghai to the USSR.

Life in the Soviet Union and Execution

He settled in the USSR in Moscow, where, in 1930, he was in charge of the timber depot at the Central Park of Culture and Rest. He lived on Novoslobodskaya street.

On August 15, 1930, he was arrested and charged with espionage and preparing an armed uprising. On April 3, 1931, he was sentenced by the OGPU College to be shot - in the case of the “Counterrevolutionary Cossack Organization “Cossack Block””, together with other persons.

He was buried at the Vagankovsky cemetery, in a common grave. Rehabilitated "in a special manner" on the basis of the first article of the Decree of the Presidium of the Supreme Soviet of the USSR of January 16, 1989.

Literature 
 
 
 Анисимов Николай Семенович (in Russian) // Челябинская область: энциклопедия / гл. ред. К. Н. Бочкарев. — Челябинск: Камен. пояс, 2008.

1877 births
1931 deaths
People from Orenburgsky Uyezd
Orenburg Cossacks
White movement generals
Russian military personnel of the Russo-Japanese War
Russian military personnel of World War I
Russian people executed by the Soviet Union